Empidadelpha is a genus of dance flies in the family Empididae.

Species
E. propria Collin, 1928
E. sobrina Collin, 1933
E. torrentalis (Miller, 1923)
E. pokekeao Kerr and Tweed, 2021

References

Empidoidea genera
Empididae